Enterovirus C is a species of enterovirus. Its best known subtype is poliovirus, the cause of poliomyelitis. There are three serotypes of poliovirus, PV1, PV2, and PV3. Other subtypes of Enterovirus C include EV-C95, EV-C96, EV-C99, EV-C102, EV-C104, EV-C105, EV-C109, EV-C116, EV-C117, and EV-C118. Some non-polio types of Enterovirus C have been associated with the polio-like condition AFP (acute flaccid paralysis), including 2 isolates of EV-C95 from Chad.

References

Enteroviruses
Polio